Down the Old Plank Road: The Nashville Sessions is a 2002 album by The Chieftains.  It is a collaboration between the Irish band and many top country music musicians including Ricky Skaggs, Vince Gill, Lyle Lovett, Martina McBride and Alison Krauss.

Track listing
All songs traditional unless indicated.

 "Down the Old Plank Road" (with John Hiatt, Béla Fleck, Jeff White and Tim O'Brien) - 2:02
 "Country Blues" (with Buddy & Julie Miller) - 3:13
 "Sally Goodin" (with Earl Scruggs & Glen Duncan) - 3:15
 "Dark as a Dungeon" (with Vince Gill and Béla Fleck) (Merle Travis) - 3:25
 "Cindy" (with Kentucky Thunder & Ricky Skaggs) - 2:38
 "Molly Bán (Bawn)" (with Alison Krauss and Béla Fleck) - 4:48
 "Don't Let Your Deal Go Down" (with Lyle Lovett) - 2:41
 Medley: "Ladies Pantalettes; Belles of Blackville; First House in Connaught" (with Béla Fleck) - 2:18
 "Whole Heap of Little Horses" (with Patty Griffin) - 2:47
 "Rain and Snow" (with The Del McCoury Band) - 2:52
 "I'll Be All Smiles Tonight" (with Martina McBride) - 4:30
 "Tennessee Stud" (with Jeff White) (Jimmy Driftwood) - 3:08
 "Katie Dear" (with Gillian Welch & David Rawlings) - 4:31
 "Give the Fiddler a Dram" (with Béla Fleck) - 10:18

Personnel
The Chieftains
 Paddy Moloney - bagpipes [Uilleann], flute, tin whistle
 Kevin Conneff - bodhrán
 Derek Bell - dulcimer [Tiompán], harp, keyboards
 Seán Keane - fiddle
 Matt Molloy - flute
Guests
 Buddy Miller - vocals (2)
 Julie Miller - vocals (2)
 Vince Gill - vocals (4)
 Ricky Skaggs - vocals, mandolin (5,14)
 Alison Krauss - vocals, viola, backing vocals (6)
 Lyle Lovett - vocals (7)
 Patty Griffin - vocals (9)
 Del McCoury - vocals, acoustic guitar (10)
 Martina McBride - vocals (11)
 David Rawlings - vocals (13)
 Gillian Welch - vocals (13)
 Shannon Forrest - drums, percussion (1-4,6,8-9,12-14)
 Jeff White - vocals, acoustic guitar (1,3-9,11-14)
 Béla Fleck - banjo, violin (1,4,6,8,14)
 Glenn Worf - double bass (1,4,8,12,14)
 Tim O'Brien - mandolin, backing vocals (1,4,8,14)
 Matt Rollings - piano (1,4,11,14)
 John Hiatt - backing vocals (1,14)
 Marc Savoy - accordion (1)
 Jeffrey Lesser - backing vocals (1)
 Bryan Sutton - acoustic guitar, clawhammer banjo, mandolin, octave mandolin (2-3,6,9,11,13-14)
 Barry Bales - double bass (2-3,6,9,13)
 Earl Scruggs - banjo (3)
 Glen Duncan - fiddle (3)
 Randy Kohrs - resonator guitar [Dobro] (4,12-14)
 Jim Mills - banjo (5)
 Mark Fain - double bass (5)
 Cody Kilby - acoustic guitar (5)
 Andy Leftwich - fiddle (5)
 Steve Buckingham - mountain dulcimer (6)
 Viktor Krauss - double bass (7)
 James Gilmer - percussion (7)
 John Hagen - cello (7)
 Robbie McCoury - banjo (10)
 Jason Carter - fiddle (10)
 Mike Bub - double bass (10)
 Ronnie McCoury - mandolin (10)
 Stuart Duncan - mandolin (11-12)
 Jeff Taylor - accordion (11)

Chart performance

References

2002 albums
The Chieftains albums
RCA Victor albums
Collaborative albums